Several ships have been named Malabar for the Malabar Coast:

 was initially named Nieuwland, launched in 1794 for the Dutch East India Company. The British seized her in 1795 and new owners renamed her Malabar. She made two complete voyages under charter to the British East India Company before she burnt at Madras in 1801 in an accident.
 was launched at Shields. In 1819 she transported convicts to Port Jackson, Australia, and then in 1821 she made a voyage transporting convicts to Van Diemen's Land. She is last listed in 1824.
 was launched at Boston. 
, of 603 tons (bm), was one of the first of Wigram & Green's Blackwall frigates, built at their Blackwall Yard. She was launched on 29 April 1834.

See also
 , several ships and a shore establishment of the Royal Navy
 , the name of a number of steamships
 , a US Navy World War II stores ship

Citations

Ship names